Guyot Glacier is a  long and  wide glacier located in the east end of the Robinson Mountains in the U.S. state of Alaska. It borders Yahtse Glacier on the northeast. The glacier was named by the New York Times expedition of 1886 for Arnold Henry Guyot.

See also
 List of glaciers
 Tyndall Glacier

References

Glaciers of Alaska
Glaciers of Yakutat City and Borough, Alaska